Hans Tichy (27 July 1861, Brno – 28 October 1925, Vienna) was an Austrian artist and a professor at the Academy of Fine Arts, Vienna.

He studied at the Academy of Fine Arts, Vienna from 1880 to 1884, under Christian Griepenkerl and August Eisenmenger. Tichy was also a student of the genre painter August von Pettenkofen.

He was a founding member of the Vienna Secession. He was elected to the presidency of the group in 1902. His painting, At the Fountain of Love, was exhibited with the group; it won him the Reichel Prize from the Academy, and it was bought by the Moderne Galerie (now the Österreichische Galerie Belvedere).

With Richard Kauffungen in 1900, he ran classes for a women's art school on drawing and painting from living models. In 1914, he was made a professor of the Vienna Academy.

Exhibitions 

 Second Great Berlin Art Exhibition, 1894.
 Fourth Exhibition of the Vienna Secession, 1899.
 Twentieth Exhibition of the Vienna Secession, 1904. Orpheus and Eurydice shown.
 Spring Exhibition of the Vienna Secession, 1906.
 Spring Exhibition of the Vienna Secession, 1908. At the Fountain of Love shown.
 Spring Exhibition of the Vienna Secession, 1910.
 International Art Exhibition, Rome, 1911.
 Winter Exhibition of the Munich Secession, 1912.

Awards 
 Reichel Prize, 1908; for the painting At the Fountain of Love.

References

External links 

1861 births
1925 deaths
Artists from Brno
People from the Margraviate of Moravia
Members of the Vienna Secession
19th-century Austrian painters
19th-century Austrian male artists
Austrian male painters
20th-century Austrian painters
Art Nouveau painters
Academy of Fine Arts Vienna alumni
Academic staff of the Academy of Fine Arts Vienna
Moravian-German people
20th-century Austrian male artists